MV Faust is a large ro-ro car carrier built in 2007 by Daewoo Shipbuilding & Marine Engineering for Wallenius Lines AB, Sweden. It is currently operated by Wallenius Wilhelmsen Logistics. It is one of the largest car carriers in the world.

In 2004, the MV Faust was renamed to MV Liberty.

Faust appeared in a 2008 episode of the Discovery Channel's documentary series Mighty Ships during a voyage between the UK and United States.

References

2007 ships
Wallenius Wilhelmsen Logistics
Ro-ro ships
Ships built by Daewoo Shipbuilding & Marine Engineering